Die Storie van Klara Viljee (The Story of Klara Viljee), is a 1992 South African drama film directed by Katinka Heyns and produced by Chris Barnard for Sonneblom Films. The film stars Anna-Mart van der Merwe in lead role along with Regardt van den Bergh, Hennie Oosthuizen and Trix Pienaar in supportive roles.

The film revolves around the life of Klara Viljee, a girl in a small fishing village when she loses her father and her fiancé at sea. The film received positive reviews and won several awards at international film festivals.

Plot
 Anna-Mart van der Merwe as Klara Viljee
 Regardt van den Bergh as Dawid Aucamp
 Hennie Oosthuizen as Soois de Swardt
 Trix Pienaar as Rose van Tonder
 Lida Botha as Tant Mollie
 Wilma Stockenström as Miss Lissie Sauer
 Gavin van den Berg as Pietman Willemse
 Michelle Scott as Engela Nel
 André Rossouw as Doors Nel
 Sandra Kotzé as Trynie Nel (as Sandra Kotze)
 Cobus Visser as Boetie
 Lyndsey Yssel as Tjoeks (Maria)
 Goliath Davids as Das Pieters
 Johan Botha as Neels
 Flip Theron as Ertjies
 Marko van der Colff as Dons
 Nic de Jager as Vorster
 Herman Pretorius as Strydom
 Dicky Claassen as Jan-Soetland
 Danielle Roets as Elsebet
 Dawie Maritz as Maansie
 Tony de Villiers as Dirk Benade
 Niggie as Niggie
 Liza de Villiers as Pietman's bride in photograph (uncredited)
 Elisabeth Storm as Beatie (uncredited)

References

External links
 
 Die Storie van Klara Viljee on fdb

1992 films
1992 drama films
South African drama films